Terrelle Vernon Smith (born March 12, 1978) is a former American football fullback. He was drafted by the New Orleans Saints in the fourth round of the 2000 NFL Draft. He played college football at Arizona State. Smith has also played for the Cleveland Browns, Arizona Cardinals and Detroit Lions. Smith's brother, Safety Da'Mon Cromartie-Smith, is a free agent.

College career
At Arizona State, Smith served as a blocking back for J.R. Redmond after moving to fullback from the linebacker position. He had twenty-two carries for 129 yards (5.7 yards-per-carry average) with one touchdown, and added eleven receptions for 95 yards.

Professional career

New Orleans Saints
Smith was drafted 96th overall in the 2000 NFL Draft by the New Orleans Saints. He signed a four-year, $1.7 million contract with the Saints. As a rookie, he appeared in fourteen games, including nine starts. He assumed the starting fullback role after being drafted and became one of the top blocking fullbacks in the league. He posted twenty-nine rushes for 131 yards and twelve receptions for 65 yards. He played all sixteen regular season games for the Saints during the 2002 season for the first time in his career, and helped bolster Deuce McAllister's rushing totals in 2003 thanks to his blocking.

Cleveland Browns
Smith was signed by the Cleveland Browns to a three-year $3.2 million contract as an unrestricted free agent on March 11, 2004, and played in all sixteen games of the 2004 season, including nine starts. He blocked for Lee Suggs' career-high 744-yard season. Smith went on to play in all sixteen games of the 2005 season (starting fifteen) and helped Reuben Droughns achieve the Browns' first thousand-yard season since the mid-1980s. On March 14, 2007, the Browns announced the release of Smith.

Arizona Cardinals
On March 23, 2007, he signed a two-year $1.8 million deal with the Cardinals. In 2007, he started 10 of 16 games and recorded the most receiving yards  since his rookie season in 2000. In 2008, he was again the starting fullback and his role increased during the Cardinals' Super Bowl run, throwing key blocks during the playoffs. When asked about his role,  Smith replied, "I'm a role player and my role is to lead the way and let my back run through the hole. It's not a statistics position . . . but in the end, if you can't block, you can't play the position."

Detroit Lions
Smith was an unrestricted free agent after the 2008 season and signed with the Detroit Lions on April 16, 2009. He was waived on December 17.

References

External links
Detroit Lions Bio

1978 births
Living people
People from Moreno Valley, California
Players of American football from California
Sportspeople from West Covina, California
American football fullbacks
Arizona State Sun Devils football players
New Orleans Saints players
Cleveland Browns players
Arizona Cardinals players
Detroit Lions players